The fourth power law (also known as the fourth power rule) states that the greater the axle load of a vehicle, the greater the stress on a road caused by the motor vehicle. The stress on the road increases in proportion to the fourth power of the axle load of the vehicle traveling on the road. This law was discovered in the course of a series of scientific experiments in the United States in the late 1950s and was decisive for the development of standard construction methods in road construction.

Background 

At the beginning of the 1950s, the American Association of State Highway Officials (AASHO) dealt with the question of how the size of the axle load affects the service life of a road pavement. For this purpose, a test track was built in Ottawa, Illinois, which consisted of six loops, each with two lanes. The lanes were paved with both asphalt and concrete of varying thicknesses. In the two-year test, trucks with different axle loads then drove the roads almost continuously. The test was called the AASHO Road Test.
 
When evaluating the series of tests, it was found that there is a connection between the thickness of the pavement, the number of load transfers and the axle load, and that these have a direct effect on the service life and condition of a road. The service life of the road is thereby reduced with approximately the fourth power of the axle load.

The accuracy of the law of the fourth power is disputed among experts, since the test results depend on many other factors, such as climatic conditions, in addition to the factors mentioned above.

Calculation examples

This example illustrates how a car, a truck and a bicycle affect the surface of a road differently according to the fourth power law.

 Car (total weight 2 tonnes, 2 axles): load per axle: 1 tonnes
 Truck (total weight 30 tonnes, 3 axles): load per axle: 10 tonnes

 times as large

The load on the road from one axle (2 wheels) is 10 times greater for a truck than for a car. However, the fourth power law says that the stress on (damage to) the road is this ratio raised to the fourth power.

The road stress ratio of truck to car is 10,000 to 1.

The same can be done for the bicycle:

 Bicycle (total weight 0.1 tonnes, 2 axles): load per axle: 0.05 tonnes, or the car has 20 times the load per axle as the bicycle

 times as large

The road stress ratio of the car to bicycle is 160,000 to 1.

This means that after 160,000 crossings, the bicycle causes as much damage as the car does when driving on the road only once. From this it can be deduced that a large part of the damage in the streets is caused by heavy motor vehicles compared to the damage caused by lighter vehicles.

See also

References

External links 

AASHO Road Test at Federal Highway Administration website

Pavement engineering
Tests